Michael N. Barnett (born November 10, 1960) is a professor of international relations at George Washington University's Elliott School of International Affairs. Known for his Constructivist approach, his scholarship and research has been in the areas of international organizations, international relations theory, and Middle Eastern politics. 

In 2010, Barnett was named University Professor of International Affairs and Political Science at George Washington University. He is considered among the most influential IR scholars. His study "Power in International Politics" (co-authored with Raymond Duvall) is among the most assigned work in international relations graduate training at American universities.

Career
He received his B.A. from the University of Illinois and his Ph.D. at the University of Minnesota. As he worked towards his undergraduate degree at the University of Illinois he worked as a storm chaser in Illinois and the greater Midwest area.  

He has taught at the University of Minnesota, the University of Wisconsin, Macalester College, Wellesley College, and the Hebrew University of Jerusalem. Additionally, he was a visiting scholar at the New School for Social Research and the Dayan Center at Tel Aviv University, and he was a visiting professor at the Graduate Institute of International Studies in Geneva, Switzerland. Most recently, Barnett held the Harold Stassen Chair of International Affairs in the Hubert H. Humphrey School of Public Affairs and Professor of Political Science at the University of Minnesota.

His most recent books are "Paternalism beyond Borders," Cambridge University Press, 2016; Empire of Humanity: A History of Humanitarianism, Cornell University Press, 2011; Humanitarianism Contested: Where Angels Fear to Tread, with Thomas G. Weiss, Routledge, 2011; and Sacred Aid: Faith and Humanitarianism, with Janice Stein (eds.) Oxford University Press, 2012. With Emanuel Adler, he reintroduced the concept of security community to international relations.

In Rules for the World (co-authored with Martha Finnemore), Barnett argue that international organizations derive power and autonomy from their rational-legal authority and control of information. International organizations are therefore purposive social agents that can act inconsistently with the intentions of the founders of the organizations (which are often states). In contrast to some realist and liberal theories of international relations, Barnett and Finnemore show that international organizations are not just a reflection of state interests and that they do not necessarily act efficiently. International organizations can develop bureaucratic cultures that result in adverse outcomes (what they call "pathologies"). They list five mechanisms that breed organizational pathologies:

 Irrationality of rationalization: when an organization sticks to existing rules and procedures regardless of circumstances rather than act in ways most appropriate for the circumstances
 Universalism: the application of universal rules and categories may not reflect specific contexts
 Normalization of deviance: deviations from existing rules can become normalized and lead to aberrational behaviors
 Organizational insulation: when organizations do not get feedback from the environment about their performance and are unable to update their behavior
 Cultural contestation: different cultures within an organization may lead to clashes that produce adverse outcomes

He is known for his study "Power in International Politics" (co-authored with Raymond Duvall), which is among the most assigned work in international relations graduate training at American universities. The study presents four forms of power:

 Compulsory Power: direct control by one actor over another actor
 Institutional Power: control exercised by actors indirectly over other actors through diffuse relations of interaction
 Structural Power: the constitution of subjects' capacities in direct structural relation to one another
 Productive Power: the socially diffuse production of subjectivity (through discursive practices) in systems of meaning and signification

Barnett consistently ranks as one of the top-20 scholars "who has done the most interesting work in international relations in recent years" according to the yearly TRIP surveys.

Selected articles

References

External links
Barnett's profile at the George Washington University

American international relations scholars
Constructivist international relations scholars
University of Illinois Urbana-Champaign alumni
American political scientists
University of Minnesota alumni
George Washington University faculty
Elliott School of International Affairs faculty
University of Wisconsin–Madison faculty
University of Minnesota faculty
1960 births
Living people